"" ("My Fatherland, My Happiness and Joy") is the national anthem of Estonia. It was adopted as the national anthem in 1920.

The lyrics were written by Johann Voldemar Jannsen and are set to a melody composed in 1848 by Fredrik (Friedrich) Pacius which is also that of the national anthem of Finland: "Maamme" (which was the unofficial anthem of the Grand Duchy of Finland). The only differences between the two anthems are their key signature and the repetition of the last four lines of each verse in the Finnish anthem. It is also considered to be an ethnic anthem for Livonian people with text "Min izāmō".

History
The song was first presented to the public as a choral work in the Grand Song Festival of Estonia in 1869 and quickly became a symbol of the Estonian National Awakening.

"Mu isamaa, mu õnn ja rõõm" was officially adopted as the national anthem of Estonia in 1920, after the Estonian War of Independence.

In 1944, the Soviet Union occupied Estonia, and "Mu isamaa, mu õnn ja rõõm" ended up being banned by the Soviet government. The Soviet Estonia had its own regional anthem. Yet the people of Estonia could often hear their former national anthem, as Finland's state broadcaster Yleisradio, whose radio and television broadcasts were received in northern Estonia, played an instrumental version of the Finnish national anthem, identical to this song (except for an additional repetition of the last verse in the Finnish version), at the conclusion of its broadcast every night.

Lyrics

See also
 "Maamme"
 "Min izāmō"

Notes

References

External links 
The Estonian national anthem - web page of the State Chancellery, an audio stream. The anthem is played by The Defence Forces Orchestra, vocals by the National Male Choir.
Streaming audio, lyrics and details of the Estonian anthem.

National symbols of Estonia
European anthems
Estonian patriotic songs
National anthems
National anthem compositions in B-flat major
National anthem compositions in C major
National anthem compositions in D major